V. S. Malimath (12 June 1929 – 22 December 2015) was an Indian jurist, who served as Chief Justice of the Kerala High Court and Karnataka High Court. He also was the Chairman of the Central Administrative Tribunal, and then member of the National Human Rights Commission of India. He headed the Committee on Reform of Criminal Justice System.

Education
Malimath did his primary education from Karnataka. He then secured First Rank in LL.B. and a post Graduate Diploma in Public International Law from University of London in 1952.

Career
Malimath started his law practice in the High Court of Bombay in 1952. He moved his practice to Bangalore in 1956. The state then appointed him Advocate General in 1968. He rose rapidly through the ranks of the Judiciary. He was appointed a Judge of the Karnataka High Court in 1970 and became Chief Justice of the Karnataka Court in 1984. He was then transferred to Kerala as its Chief Justice in 1985.

He served on the Central Administrative Tribunal as its chair. He served as a member of the  National Human Rights Commission. After his retirement from the high court he also headed the Committee on Reform of Criminal Justice System in India. He was a  U.N. Representative to monitor human rights enforcement in Nigeria  and Sri Lanka.  The International Bar Association appointed him as part of a fact finding mission to Sri Lanka to assess the circumstances surrounding a call for a constitutional referendum and its effect on the country's judiciary.

He was also the chair of the Karnataka Border Protection Committee.
He also headed committee for reforms in Code of Civil Procedure.

Awards and honors
He represented India in several international conferences. He was conferred with the National Citizen's Award by the President of India, Rajyotsava Award by the Government of Karnataka, and an Honorary Doctorate of Law by Karnataka University.
In 2011, Hampi University conferred the Nadoja Award upon V.S. Malimath.

References

Judges of the Karnataka High Court
1929 births
2015 deaths
Chief Justices of the Karnataka High Court
20th-century Indian judges
Chief Justices of the Kerala High Court
20th-century Indian lawyers
Alumni of the University of London